Chota Inak is a village in the Nicobar district of Andaman and Nicobar Islands, India. It is located in the Nancowry tehsil. The name means "Little Inake"; contrasted with Bada Inak ("Greater Inak").

Demographics 

According to the 2011 census of India, Chota Inak has 42 households. The effective literacy rate (i.e. the literacy rate of population excluding children aged 6 and below) is 77.54%.

References 

Villages in Nancowry tehsil